The 2011 Al-Nakba International Football Tournament was a football competition organized by the Palestinian Football Association to commemorate the Nakba. It was held in Palestine in May 2011, and featured an appearance by the then-president of FIFA, Sepp Blatter.

Teams
16 teams participated from:

 
 
 
 
  (hosts)

Groups

Group A

Group B

Group C

Group D

Knockout stage

References

International
2010–11 in Syrian football
2010–11 in Jordanian football
2010–11 in South African soccer
2010–11 in Hungarian football
2011 in Chilean football
2011 in Mauritanian sport
2011 in Senegalese sport
2011